The Winnipesaukee Playhouse is a 200+ seat courtyard-style theater in Meredith, New Hampshire, United States, in the heart of New Hampshire's Lakes Region. The Playhouse produces both a professional summer stock season and a community theater season, and is arguably the only theater in the United States to do so. The Winnipesaukee Playhouse is the recipient of 46 New Hampshire Theater Awards over the past eight years, more than any other theater in the state during this time period, and in 2009 it was selected by New Hampshire Magazine as the best professional theater in New Hampshire. In 2013 the Playhouse moved from Weirs Beach in Laconia to the former Annalee Dolls campus in Meredith. The new theater has 200 seats as well as support spaces such as offices, dressing rooms, and a lobby, which the previous theater did not have.

History
The Winnipesaukee Playhouse was founded in 2004 by brother and sister Bryan Halperin and Lesley Pankhurst and their spouses, Johanna and Neil. They opened the Playhouse in the Alpenrose Plaza (the former Dexter Shoes outlet plaza) in the village of Weirs Beach in the city of Laconia, New Hampshire. The theater started with a professional summer stock season, and continued with community theater and children's theater during the rest of the year. In 2006 it became a non-profit organization.

In 2008, Hidden Green LLC, investors in the Winnipesaukee Playhouse, purchased the Annalee Dolls factory site for $1.05 million. The Playhouse renovated this property to create a "Tanglewood type of setting" to perform theater and other endeavors in. The theater moved from its previous site in Weirs Beach to the site of Annalee's former gift shop in 2013.

As of 2012, the Winnipesaukee Playhouse had performed 91 plays, 45 of which were professional summer stock, with the rest being community theater or children's theater.

New theater

The access to the Annalee Dolls campus allowed the Winnipesaukee Playhouse to greatly expand and create the first performing arts complex in the Lakes Region of New Hampshire. The new campus offers a state-of-the-art theatre that can seat about 200 patrons, a summer theatre camp for students entering grades K–8, an outdoor amphitheater with performances available before select shows, and a brand-new menu. The entire project to create a performing arts campus cost roughly $4 million. The new theater, with almost 200 seats, more than doubles the audience space that the previous theatre held (84 seats).

References

External links

 Winnipesaukee Playhouse official site
 Current and upcoming performances

Organizations established in 2004
Theatres in New Hampshire
Buildings and structures in Belknap County, New Hampshire
Tourist attractions in Belknap County, New Hampshire
Meredith, New Hampshire